Nebojša "Cile" Ilić (born 25 June 1973) is a Serbian actor. He appeared in more than forty films since 1996.

Filmography

Film

Television

References

External links 

1973 births
Living people
Male actors from Belgrade
Serbian male film actors